Cyprian Enweani (born March 19, 1964 in Copenhagen, Denmark) is a Saskatoon, Saskatchewan resident and 1989 inductee into the Saskatoon Sports Hall of Fame for his career as sprinter. His most notable athletic accomplishment was appearing as a member of the Canadian Olympic Team at the 1988 Summer Olympics in Seoul, Korea where he competed in the 200 metres sprint and the 4 x 100 metres relay.

Biography
After hearing Diane Jones-Konihowski speak after the 1976 Summer Olympics in Montreal, Cyprian Enweani began sprinting at the age of 12. By age 17, he was on the Saskatchewan Canada Games team and became the high school record holder in the 200m and 400m distances in 1982. In 1983, he participated at the Pan-American Games as a member of the 4 x 100 metre relay team, which came in fourth. During his tenure at the University of Saskatchewan, where he studied and graduated from the college of medicine, Enweani set school and Canada West records in the 60m (6.84 seconds set on March 3, 1984), 200m (21.27 seconds set on February 15, 1987), and 300m (33.56 seconds set on February 3, 1984). In 1988, Enweani competed at the Summer Olympics. Though he was ninth overall in the 200 metres—he did not make it past the semi-finals—Enweani set a new Saskatchewan 200 metres record in each heat he ran, with his final race clocking in at 20.57 seconds, a personal best. Enweani was also a member of the 4 x 100 metres relay team at the 1988 Olympics, which came in 7th.

In 1989, he was named Kinsmen Athlete of the Year. That same year, he competed at the World University Games where he met Vanessa Monar, fellow athlete and U of S student. Four years later, in 1993, they would marry. Enweani coached his wife for the rest of her career as a long jumper. He graduated from the U of S in 1989 with a degree in medicine and today practices in Saskatoon as a family and sports doctor.

References

External links
 
 
 
 
 
 
 Saskatoon Sports Hall of Fame Profile
 University of Saskatchewan Track and Field Records
 Canada West Track and Field Records
 Sports Medicine and Science Council of Saskatchewan Directory
 Saskatoon Blades Staff

1964 births
Living people
Sportspeople from Copenhagen
Black Canadian track and field athletes
Pan American Games track and field athletes for Canada
Athletes (track and field) at the 1983 Pan American Games
Athletes (track and field) at the 1988 Summer Olympics
Athletes (track and field) at the 1990 Commonwealth Games
Commonwealth Games competitors for Canada
Athletes from Saskatoon
Canadian male sprinters
Danish emigrants to Canada
Olympic track and field athletes of Canada
World Athletics Championships athletes for Canada
Canadian sportspeople of Nigerian descent
Saskatchewan Huskies players
University of Saskatchewan alumni
Universiade medalists in athletics (track and field)
Universiade silver medalists for Canada
Medalists at the 1985 Summer Universiade